The R436 road is a regional road in Ireland linking Kilbeggan, County Westmeath and Ferbane, County Offaly. It passes through the town of Clara, County Offaly, Ballycumber, through cutaway peat bogs to Ferbane where it terminates at the N62.

See also
Roads in Ireland
National primary road
National secondary road

References
Roads Act 1993 (Classification of Regional Roads) Order 2006 – Department of Transport

Regional roads in the Republic of Ireland
Roads in County Offaly
Roads in County Westmeath